Dingra railway station (Balochi: دنگرا ریلوے اسٹیشن) is located in Dingra village, Kachhi district of Balochistan province, Pakistan.

See also
 List of railway stations in Pakistan
 Pakistan Railways

References

Railway stations in Kachhi District
Railway stations on Rohri–Chaman Railway Line